Rinkeby is a district in the Rinkeby-Kista borough, Stockholm, Sweden. Rinkeby had 19,349 inhabitants in 2016. The neighbourhood was part of the Million Programme.

The Stockholm metro station Rinkeby was also opened in 1975.

Rinkeby is noted for its high concentration of immigrants and people with immigrant ancestry. 89.1% of the suburb's population had a first- or second-generation immigrant background as of 2007.

A sociolect called Rinkeby Swedish has been named after Rinkeby. This is also said to be used all over the suburbs in Stockholm and across Sweden.

The district was a part of the Rinkeby borough until 1 January 2007, when it was merged with Kista borough to form the Rinkeby-Kista borough.

In the years preceding 2008, the state Social Insurance Agency, state Public Employment Service, banks and postal services vacated their offices in the area.

In 2010, the official figures stated 15,000 people lived in the area, but officials admitted 17,000 were more likely though uncertainties meant the figure could be higher still. Of those, 90% had a migration background and 37.6% were from Africa. With the area being home to a large number of immigrants, many from Somalia, the area is sometimes called 'Little Mogadishu'.

In its December 2014 report, Swedish Police placed it as most severe category of urban areas with high crime rates.

Demographics
Rinkeby is inhabited by a diverse array of immigrants. As of 2011, most were from Iraq (3,155), Iran (2,909), Somalia (2,878), Turkey (1,819), Finland (1,090), Ethiopia (1,026), Eritrea (914), former Yugoslavia (796), Greece (768), Poland (757), Chile (711), Syria (631), China (589), Pakistan (456), India (414), Bangladesh (414), Morocco (344) and Lebanon (289).

In the 2011-13 period, about 53% of the population originated outside the EU and the Nordic countries.

Social unrest

According to the Swedish Defence University, since the 1970s, a number of residents of Rinkeby and other local areas have been implicated in providing logistical and financial support to or joining various foreign-based transnational militant groups. Among these organizations are Hezbollah, Hamas, the PKK, the GIA, the Abu Nidal Organization, the Japanese Red Army, the Red Army Faction, Al-Qaeda, the Islamic State, Al-Shabaab, Ansar al-Sunna and Ansar al-Islam.

In June 2010, and again in 2014, the Rinkeby police station was attacked by rioting local youths; in 2014, it was shut down.

In 2016, an Australian news team from 60 Minutes, along with Jan Sjunnesson, an editor of the Swedish far-right publication Avpixlat (who have since changed their name to Samhällsnytt), had their camera man allegedly hit by a car when they arrived in Rinkeby. After making contact with inhabitants, the team were surrounded by young, aggressive men. The police were present nearby, but had opted not to make their presence known, for fear of antagonising locals. In the attack that followed, the crew were hit and kicked. In May of the same year, an interview team of the Norwegian public broadcaster NRK, along with Swedish police and economist Tino Sanandaji were attacked.

Riots also broke out among immigrant youths in Rinkeby in 2010, 2013 and 2017. In 2017, fires were started by rioters, and at least seven cars were burned. Rioters threw rocks at police, who responded with warning shots, and later with "shots for effect" intended to hit their target.

In 2017, the construction of a new, more robust police station in the area was delayed, due to construction companies being unwilling to tender for the contract due to security concerns over attacks on equipment or threats towards employees. Owing to the threat level, and that people in the area were resisting the building of a police station, the construction site was given security guards. In August 2018, the construction site for the new police station was attacked by unidentified assailants. They used a car to force the gate and threw rocks and fireworks at security guards. The assailants then set the vehicle afire.

References

Districts in Västerort
Metropolitan Stockholm